The .357 SIG (designated as the 357 Sig by the SAAMI and 357 SIG by the C.I.P. or 9×22mm in unofficial metric notation) is a bottlenecked rimless centerfire handgun cartridge developed by the Swiss-German firearms manufacturer SIG Sauer, in cooperation with ammunition manufacturer Federal Premium.  The cartridge is used by a number of law enforcement agencies.

History

The .357 SIG is based on a necked-down 10mm Auto case. Other than specialized competition cartridges like the 9×25mm Dillon (1988), which necked a 10mm Auto case down to a 9 mm bullet, the .357 SIG (1994) was the first modern bottleneck commercial handgun cartridge since the early 1960s, when Winchester introduced a .257 caliber round based on the .357 Magnum, the now obsolete .256 Winchester Magnum (1960). Then Remington introduced the unsuccessful .22 Remington Jet (1961), which necked a .357 Magnum case down to a .22 caliber bullet, and the .221 Remington Fireball (1963), a shortened version of their .222 Remington. 

Due to its expense, as .357 SIG practice ammo is about twice the cost of 9mm and around 50% more than .40 S&W, .357 SIG never achieved widespread adoption like .40 S&W.

Cartridge dimensions
The .357 SIG has 1.27 ml (19.5 grains H2O) cartridge case capacity.

.357 SIG maximum C.I.P. cartridge dimensions. All sizes in millimeters.

Several sources have published contradicting information regarding .357 SIG headspacing.  This is due to the cartridge having been originally designed as a .357 (9.02mm) round, but then rapidly adapted to the .355 (9mm) bullet.  According to the official C.I.P. (Commission Internationale Permanente Pour L'Epreuve Des Armes A Feu Portatives) 2008 revised documents, the .357 SIG headspaces on the case mouth (H2). Some US sources are in conflict with this standard.  However, the cartridge and chamber drawing in the ANSI/SAAMI American National Standards also clearly shows the cartridge headspacing on the case mouth. Likewise, US reloading supplier Lyman has published that the .357 SIG headspaces on the case mouth.

According to the C.I.P. rulings the .357 SIG case can handle up to 305 MPa (44,236 psi) piezo pressure. In C.I.P. regulated countries every pistol cartridge combo has to be proofed at 130% of this maximum C.I.P. pressure to certify for sale to consumers.
The SAAMI pressure limit for the .357 SIG is set at 275.80 MPa (40,000 psi), piezo pressure.

Conversions

Most .40 S&W pistols can be converted to .357 SIG by replacing the barrel, but sometimes the recoil spring must also be changed. Pistols with especially strong recoil springs can accept either cartridge with a barrel change. Magazines will freely interchange between the two cartridges in most pistols. .357 SIG barrel kits have allowed this cartridge to gain in popularity among handgun owners.

Performance
The table below shows common performance parameters for several .357 SIG loads. Bullet weights ranging from  have been offered. Note: Underwood now also offers a standard pressure 65 gr .357 SIG Xtreme Defender (XD) round with a muzzle velocity of 2100 fps, muzzle energy of 636 ft. lbs. and a penetration depth of 17.5 inches.

Key:
Expansion – expanded bullet diameter (ballistic gelatin).
Penetration – penetration depth (ballistic gelatin).
PC – permanent cavity volume (ballistic gelatin, FBI method).
TSC – temporary stretch cavity volume (ballistic gelatin).

Because of its relatively high velocity for a handgun round, the .357 SIG has an unusually flat trajectory, extending the effective range. Offsetting this general slight disadvantage in performance is that semi-automatic pistols tend to carry considerably more ammunition than revolvers.

The Virginia State Police has reported that attacking dogs have been stopped dead in their tracks by a single shot, whereas the former 147 grain 9 mm duty rounds would require multiple shots to incapacitate the animals. Proponents of the hydrostatic shock theory contend that the energy available in the .357 SIG is sufficient for imparting hydrostatic shock with well-designed bullets.  Users have commented, "We're really impressed with the stopping power of the .357 SIG round."

The bottleneck shape of the .357 SIG cartridge makes feeding problems almost non-existent.

The "Accurate Powder" reloading manual claims that it is "without a doubt the most ballistically consistent handgun cartridge we have ever worked with."

Characteristics

The goal of the .357 SIG project was to offer a level of performance equal to the highly effective  .357 Magnum load. Measurements of standard factory .357 SIG cartridges loaded with  bullets showed approximate muzzle velocities of  out of a  barrel, which is essentially identical to the .357 Magnum with the same bullet weight and barrel length. These measurements were performed with a Thompson Center Encore 1842 break-action, single-shot pistol/rifle, preventing differing barrel length definitions between semi-automatic pistols and revolvers giving revolvers a potential muzzle velocity advantage.

With a simplistic approach to physics, recoil being directly proportional to "muzzle velocity × bullet mass" (due to conservation of momentum), the recoil of the .357 SIG is equal to or slightly less than that of the .40 S&W, and less than that of the full-power 10mm Auto loads or the original .357 Magnum, This simple approach to recoil is incomplete since the properties of the bullet alone do not determine the felt recoil, but also the rocket-like blast of propellant gases coming out of the barrel after the bullet leaves the muzzle. A more accurate view on recoil is that it is proportional to the mass of all ejecta × velocity of ejecta.

Implementation
 
In 1994, Sig released the P229 pistol, the first production handgun introduced that was chambered in .357 SIG and specifically designed to handle the higher pressures of that round.

However, in 2013 the Texas DPS decided to replace their .357 SIG handguns with 9mm handguns. The ability to carry more rounds per magazine (9mm vs. .357 SIG) in a lighter gun were among the stated reasons for the change. That transition was suspended after recruits in the A-2014 class, the first to train with the new S&W M&P 9mm polymer handguns, experienced numerous malfunctions with those weapons.

The newer SIG Sauer P229 in .357 SIG has been adopted for use by agents and officers of the following national and state law enforcement organizations (LEO):
 Federal Air Marshals
 Delaware State Police
 Texas Ranger Division
 Virginia State Police
 Richmond Police Department

See also
List of firearms
List of handgun cartridges
Table of handgun and rifle cartridges
9 mm caliber
.357 SuperMag
.357 Remington Maximum
.357 Magnum
.429 DE (similar concept: necking a .50 AE cartridge down to .429 caliber)
9×25mm Dillon (similar concept: necking a 10mm Auto cartridge down to 9mm caliber)
.22 TCM (similar concept: necking a 9mm diameter case down to .22 caliber)
10mm Auto

References

External links

 Ballistics by the Inch .357 SIG results

Paramilitary cartridges
357
1994 establishments in Switzerland
1994 establishments in the United States
SIG Sauer cartridges
Weapons and ammunition introduced in 1994